The 1999 Oyo State gubernatorial election occurred in Nigeria on January 9, 1999. The AD nominee Lam Adesina won the election, defeating the PDP candidate.

Lam Adesina emerged AD candidate.

Electoral system
The Governor of Oyo State is elected using the plurality voting system.

Primary election

AD primary
The AD primary election was won by Lam Adesina.

Results
The total number of registered voters in the state was 2,397,270. Total number of votes cast was 714,312, while number of valid votes was 693,349. Rejected votes were 20,963.

References 

Oyo State gubernatorial elections
Gubernatorial election 1999
Oyo State gubernatorial election
Oyo State gubernatorial election
Oyo State gubernatorial election